Samantha Crawford (born February 18, 1995) is a former American tennis player.

In her career, Crawford won one singles title and five doubles titles on the ITF Women's Circuit. In July 2016, she reached her best singles ranking of world No. 98. On July 13, 2015, she peaked at No. 216 in the WTA doubles rankings.

As a junior, Atlanta-born Crawford won the girls' singles title at the 2012 US Open, defeating Anett Kontaveit in the final.

Career

2012
Crawford received a wildcard into the qualifying of the US Open. She got into the competition with wins over Irina Khromacheva and Marie-Ève Pelletier, and played Eleni Daniilidou for a spot in the main draw, winning in three sets. In her first women's Grand Slam main-draw appearance, Crawford lost to fellow teenager Laura Robson.

2015
In 2015, Crawford came into the US Open by winning the Wild Card Challenge, a three-week series of hardcourt events played out on the USTA Pro Circuit.

2016
At the Brisbane International, Crawford caused an upset by defeating top-15 player Belinda Bencic in the second round. She subsequently went on to reach her first semifinal on the WTA Tour, but lost the match to former world No. 1 and eventual champion, Victoria Azarenka, in straight sets.

ITF finals

Singles: 6 (1 title, 5 runner–ups)

Doubles: 8 (5 titles, 3 runner–ups)

Junior career

Grand Slam finals

Girls' singles: 1 title

References

External links

 
 

1995 births
Living people
Tennis players from Atlanta
American female tennis players
US Open (tennis) junior champions
Grand Slam (tennis) champions in girls' singles
American people of Chinese descent
Chinese-American tennis players
21st-century American women